Shinjo may refer to:

 Shinjō, Yamagata, a city in Japan
 Shinjō, Okayama, a village in Japan
 Shinjō, Nara, a former town in Japan
 Shinjō (surname)